Parenthood is a 1989 American family comedy-drama film with an ensemble cast that includes Steve Martin, Tom Hulce, Rick Moranis, Martha Plimpton, Keanu Reeves, Jason Robards, Mary Steenburgen, and Dianne Wiest.

The film was directed by Ron Howard, who assisted in developing the story with screenwriters Lowell Ganz and Babaloo Mandel. Much of it is based on the family and parenting experiences of Howard, Ganz, Mandel, and producer Brian Grazer, who have at least 17 children among the four of them. Principal photography was filmed in and around Orlando, Florida with some scenes filmed at the University of Florida. It was nominated for two Academy Awards: Dianne Wiest for Best Supporting Actress and Randy Newman for Best Song for "I Love to See You Smile".

The film was adapted into an NBC television series in 1990 and 2010. While the first series was canceled after one season, the second series ran for six seasons.

Plot
Gil Buckman, a St. Louis sales executive, is trying to balance his family and his career. When he finds out that his eldest son, Kevin, has emotional problems and needs therapy and that his two younger children, Taylor and Justin, both have issues as well, he begins to blame himself and questions his abilities as a father. When his wife, Karen, becomes pregnant with their fourth child, he is unsure whether he can handle it.

Gil is also frustrated and fearful that the financial burdens of another child and office politics at work are turning him into the detached workaholic he despised in his own father, Frank. Humbled by family and work issues, Gil opens up to Frank about his doubts as a parent. Frank tells him that he worries too much, and they have a reconciliation of sorts with Frank telling Gil that worry for one's children never ends. Gil is finally able to accept the life he has chosen after his elderly grandmother tells him the story of her first experience riding a roller coaster when she was young and was amazed at all of the different emotions she experienced compared to the merry-go-round which was simple and bland.

Gil's older sister, Helen, is a divorced bank manager whose wealthy dentist ex-husband wants nothing to do with their kids, Garry and Julie, aside from small child support payments, and spends more time with his own second family. Garry, who has just entered puberty, is quiet and withdrawn and likes to be alone in his room with a mysterious paper bag. At first, Helen worries that it contains drugs or alcohol, but later finds it actually contains pornography.

Julie is still in high school but is not interested in her education. She and her boyfriend, Tod Higgins, get married, she becomes pregnant, and Tod moves into Helen's house. Helen asks Tod to talk with Garry believing he would be more comfortable confiding to another male. Tod reassures Garry that his obsession with girls and sex is normal for a boy his age, to Garry's relief. This also increases Helen's respect for Tod, especially when Tod reveals his own past involving his abusive father and his determination not to follow the same path. Eventually, she supports Tod and Julie's relationship to the extent that when Julie wants to break up with Tod, Helen orders her to face her fears and work on their relationship. Helen also starts dating Garry's science teacher, giving Garry a father figure he has long been without.

Gil and Helen's younger sister, Susan, is a middle school teacher married to scientist and researcher Nathan Huffner. They have a precocious daughter, Patty. Susan wants more children, but Nathan is more interested in Patty's cognitive development. Susan lashes out by eating junk food and compromises her diaphragm as a plan to get pregnant against Nathan's wishes. She eventually gets so frustrated that she leaves Nathan, who eventually comes to one of her classes and serenades her to win her back promising her he will try to change. She agrees to move back home.

The youngest, Larry, is the black sheep of the family but is Frank's favorite. Rather than settle into a career, he has drifted through life trying to cash in on get-rich-quick schemes. He has recently shown up along with his biracial son, Cool (the result of a brief affair with a Las Vegas showgirl), asking to borrow money from Frank. It soon becomes apparent that he needs it to pay off gambling debts ($26,000 worth, equivalent to $60,000 in 2022) or he will be killed. Frank is disillusioned but still loves him and tries to help. Frank refuses to bail him out completely but offers to teach him the family business so he can take over for Frank who has to put off retirement to pay off the debt. However, Larry instead suggests another get-rich-quick scheme which involves him going to Chile. Frank agrees to look after Cool knowing that Larry will most likely never return, and the fact that Larry will not take care of Cool.

The family is reunited at the hospital when Helen gives birth to a daughter. Frank holds Cool who is shown to have been fully embraced by the family, and thriving. Tod and Julie are together, raising their son. Susan is visibly pregnant. Gil and Karen are now the parents of four.

Cast

Release

Box office
It eventually grossed over $100million domestically and $126million worldwide.

Critical reception
The film received critical acclaim. On review aggregator Rotten Tomatoes, the film holds a "Certified Fresh" approval rating of 92% based on 59 reviews, with an average score of 7.50/10. The website's critical consensus reads: "Bolstered by a delightful cast, Parenthood is a funny and thoughtfully crafted look at the best and worst moments of family life that resonates broadly". On Metacritic, the film received a score of 82 based on 17 reviews, indicating "universal acclaim". Audiences polled by CinemaScore gave the film an average grade of "A" on an A+ to F scale.

Accolades

It was also nominated by the American Film Institute for their 100 Years...100 Laughs series.

Television adaptations
The film was adapted twice to TV: as a 1990 series and again in 2010.

1990 series

Parenthood was one of several failed movie-to-TV adaptations in the 1990–91 season, also including Baby Talk on ABC's TGIF (a follow up to Look Who's Talking), Ferris Bueller on NBC and Uncle Buck on CBS. It ran for 12 episodes and was not renewed for a second season.

2010 series

A new television adaptation loosely based on the film began to air in 2010. Craig T. Nelson and Bonnie Bedelia play the parents, joined by Peter Krause, Mae Whitman, Erika Christensen, Dax Shepard, Lauren Graham and Monica Potter. It ran for six seasons and ended in January 2015.

References

External links

 
 
 
 
 
 
 

1989 comedy films
1989 films
Films about dysfunctional families
Films adapted into television shows
Films directed by Ron Howard
Films produced by Brian Grazer
Films scored by Randy Newman
Films set in Missouri
Films set in St. Louis
Films shot in Florida
Films with screenplays by Babaloo Mandel
Films with screenplays by Lowell Ganz
Imagine Entertainment films
Midlife crisis films
Parenthood (franchise)
Universal Pictures films
Films about families
Films about parenting
Films about puberty
Films about marriage
1980s English-language films